Steve Cuden (born September 25, 1955, in Pittsburgh, Pennsylvania) is an American screenwriter, director, lyricist, playwright, author, theater lighting designer, artist, and teacher. He is best known for his work on the Broadway musical, Jekyll & Hyde, as well as his writing for numerous television series.

Biography 

The eldest son of Dr. Charles L. Cuden and Helen M. Cuden, he graduated from Taylor Allderdice High School in 1973. Cuden attended the University of Wisconsin-Madison from 1973–1976 and the University of Southern California from 1976–1978, from where he graduated with a B.A. in Theater. Upon graduation from USC, he became the USC School of Theater's Master Electrician. Cuden was married to Lisa Ann Kranz from 1993–1996, but the marriage ended in divorce. Cuden received an MFA in Screenwriting from UCLA's School of Theater, Film, and Television in 2010. He began teaching Screenwriting at Point Park University in Pittsburgh, Pennsylvania, in 2011.

Career 

It was while Cuden was working as the Master Electrician at USC's School of Theatre on a musical called Christopher, written by composer Frank Wildhorn, that the two met, struck up a friendship, and began to collaborate on writing musicals.  Their first effort was a song cycle based on the life of Julius Caesar called The High and Mighty Caesar. They also collaborated on a musical based on the lives of Nicholas and Alexandra called The Last Tsar. In 1980, Cuden and Wildhorn wrote the first two versions that they would create of a musical based on Robert Louis Stevenson's classic story, The Strange Case of Dr. Jekyll and Mr. Hyde.  The second version that they wrote, which Cuden then titled, Jekyll & Hyde, was completed in 1986.  The musical was nearly produced on Broadway in 1988, with Terrence Mann set to star, but the production never came to fruition due to the financial backers withdrawing funding prior to rehearsals.  Leslie Bricusse replaced Cuden in 1988 as the musical's librettist. Cuden still retains both co-conceptual and co-lyrics credits on the show. Jekyll & Hyde ran on Broadway at the Plymouth Theatre from April 1997 through January 2001 for a total of 1543 performances. Its first revival on Broadway opened in April 2013, and closed after thirty performances.

Cuden and Wildhorn also co-conceived a musical based on the story of Rudolf, the last Crown Prince of the Austro-Hungarian Empire, and his death at his hunting lodge, Mayerling.  Originally called Vienna, the musical was not completed prior to Cuden and Wildhorn parting ways. Wildhorn later revived the idea, first with Nan Knighton, and later with Jack Murphy.  They retitled it, Rudolf: Affaire Mayerling.  The musical has been produced in Hungary, Austria, Japan, and Korea.  Cuden still retains co-conceptual credits and co-lyrics credits.

Cuden is well known for writing episodes of television animation for popular shows as: The Batman, X-Men, Iron Man, Loonatics Unleashed, Xiaolin Showdown, Goof Troop, The Mask, Bonkers, Quack Pack, Gargoyles, Beetlejuice, The Pink Panther, Savage Dragon, RoboCop, Stargate Infinity, Exosquad, Skeleton Warriors, and Mummies Alive.

Cuden is also known for directing Lucky, an independently produced, multiple award-winning horror-comedy feature that was released by MTI Home Video in 2004.

In the 1980s, Cuden won numerous awards for designing lighting of stage productions in Los Angeles, including 3 Plays of Love and Hate, for director John Cassavetes, Playing for Time, for director Mimi Leder, Piece de Resistance, for director Abraham Polonsky, and Dinner and Drinks, for director Monte Markham. Cuden was Supervisor of Ride and Show Lighting at Universal Studios Florida from 1989-1990.

In 2013, Cuden published a book titled, Beating Broadway: How to Create Stories for Musicals That Get Standing Ovations.

In 2015, as a companion book to Beating Broadway, Cuden published, Beating Hollywood: Tips for Creating Unforgettable Screenplays.

In 2017, Cuden launched a new podcast, StoryBeat: Storytellers on Storytelling, which he produces and hosts. Shows focus on in-depth interviews with artists from all disciplines regarding their creative process. Works 

 Podcasts StoryBeat with Steve Cuden Books Beating Hollywood: Tips for Creating Unforgettable Screenplays, 2015, Cudwerks ProductionsBeating Broadway: How to Create Stories for Musicals That Get Standing Ovations, 2013, Cudwerks Productions

 Musicals 

Jekyll & Hyde, The Musical, Co-Conceived for the Stage, and Co-Lyrics
Tours: U.S., 1995-1996, 1999-2000, 2001–2002, 2012-2013
Broadway: The Plymouth Theatre, 1997-2001, The Marquis Theatre, 2013
Translated into more than twenty languages and produced in multiple venues around the world
Rudolf: Affaire Mayerling, Co-Conceived for the Stage, and Co-Lyrics
Productions in Hungary, Vienna, Japan, and Korea

 Feature films Lucky, Muddfilms/MTI Home Video, released 2004, director/co-producer

 Television - Staff Writer - Animation Bonkers (1993-1994): Synd/Disney TV AnimationGoof Troop (1992): Synd/Disney TV AnimationQuack Pack (1996): Synd/Disney TV Animation

 Television - Writer - Animation 
 Little Shop (1991): Fox/Saban Entertainment
 Beetlejuice (1991): Fox/Nelvana
 Goof Troop (1992): ABC/Walt Disney Television Animation
 Bonkers (1993-1994): Syndicated/Walt Disney Television Animation
 Exosquad (1994): Syndicated/Universal Cartoon Studios
 Skeleton Warriors (1994): CBS/Graz Entertainment
 Creepy Crawlers (1994-1995): Syndicated/Saban Entertainment
 X-Men (1995): Fox/Graz Entertainment
 Iron Man (1995): Syndicated/Rainbow Animation Korea
 The Pink Panther (1995): Syndicated/Wang Film Productions
 G.I. Joe Extreme (1995): USA/Gunther-Wahl Animation
 The Savage Dragon (1995-1996): USA/Universal Cartoon Studios
 Street Fighter (1996): USA/USA Studios
 Quack Pack (1996): Syndicated/Walt Disney Television Animation
 Wing Commander Academy (1996): USA/Universal Cartoon Studios
 Gargoyles (1996): ABC/Walt Disney Television Animation
 The Mask: Animated Series (1996-1997): Syndicated/Sunbow Entertainment
 Extreme Ghostbusters (1997): Syndicated/Columbia-TriStar
 Mummies Alive! (1997): Syndicated/DIC Entertainment
 Pocket Dragon Adventures (1998), Syndicated/BKN Entertainment
 RoboCop: Alpha Commando (1998-1999): Syndicated/MGM Animation
 Sonic Underground (1999): Syndicated/DIC Productions
 Shadow Raiders (1999): Syndicated/Mainframe Entertainment
 Roughnecks: The Starship Troopers Chronicles  (1999-2000): Syndicated/Columbia-TriStar
 Godzilla: The Series (2000): Fox/Columbia-TriStar
 NASCAR Racers (2000-2001): Fox/Saerom Animation
 Stargate Infinity (2002-2003): Fox/DIC Entertainment
 Xiaolin Showdown (2004-2006): WB/Warner Bros. Animation
 Biker Mice from Mars (2006-2007): Syndicated/Brentwood TV Funnies
 Loonatics Unleashed (2006-2007): WB/Warner Bros. AnimationThe Batman (2007), WB/Warner Bros. Animation
 World of Quest (2008): WB/Cookie Jar Entertainment
 Xiaolin Chronicles (2014): Disney XD/Genao Productions

 Teaching 

Point Park University, Assistant Professor, Screenwriting, 2011–2020

 Awards 

 Feature films Lucky (Director/Co-Producer)
Winner - Best Director - Nodance Film Festival, 2002
Winner - Best Feature - New York City Horror Film Festival, 2002
Winner - Best Feature - MicroCineFest, Baltimore, 2002
Winner - Best Feature - Shriekfest Film Festival, Los Angeles, 2003
Winner - Fan Favorite - Shriekfest Film Festival, Los Angeles, 2003
Winner - Best Feature - Weekend of Fear, Nuremberg, Germany, 2003

 Lighting design 

Dramalogue Drama Critics AwardsIn Trousers, 1984Strider, 1983Love Streams, 1981
L.A. Weekly LAWEE AwardsIn Trousers, 1984Livin' Dolls, 19843 Plays of Love and Hate: Knives, Love Streams, The Third Day Comes, 1981
L.A. Drama Critics Circle AwardsIn Trousers'' - Nomination, 1984

Memberships 

Writers Guild of America, West
Writers Guild of Canada
Dramatists Guild
Animation Guild
ASCAP

Boards of directors 

Pittsburgh Irish and Classical Theatre (PICT), 2012–2017
The Denis Theatre Foundation, 2011–2017
Academy for New Musical Theatre, Los Angeles, 2008-2011
Front Porch Theatricals, Pittsburgh, PA, 2019–Present

References

External links 
Steve Cuden - Official Website
StoryBeat - Official Website
Beating Broadway - Official Website
Beating Hollywood - Official Website

1955 births
Living people
American male screenwriters
American television writers
American television producers
American male television writers
University of Wisconsin–Madison alumni
USC School of Dramatic Arts alumni
UCLA Film School alumni
Screenwriting instructors